Jason Andrew Alchin (born 17 March 1967) is an Australian former professional rugby league footballer who primarily played as a halfback.  He played for Canterbury-Bankstown, St. George and Western Suburbs in the New South Wales Rugby League (NSWRL) competition.

Background
Alchin was born in Newcastle, New South Wales. He was selected for Australian schoolboys rugby league team while attending Toormina High School.

Playing career
Alchin made his first grade debut for Canterbury against Balmain in round 18 1985.  Alchin did not feature in Canterbury's premiership winning team of that year.

In 1986, Alchin only made 3 appearances and did not play in the club's grand final loss to Parramatta.  In 1988, Alchin played in Canterbury's premiership winning side which defeated Balmain in the grand final which was played at the Sydney Football Stadium.  Alchin departed Canterbury at the end of 1990 after making 136 appearances for the club across all grades.

In 1991, Alchin joined St George.  He scored a try on debut for the club against Parramatta at Parramatta Stadium but only played 2 further games after that.  In 1992, Alchin joined Western Suburbs.  He played for Wests in the 1992 finals series in which they were eliminated in the first week by the Newcastle Knights.

Alchin played with Western Suburbs until the end of the 1995 season before retiring.  His final game in the top grade was ironically against Canterbury in round 17 1995 at Campbelltown Stadium.

References

External links
Bulldogs profile

1967 births
Living people
Rugby league players from Newcastle, New South Wales
Australian rugby league players
Canterbury-Bankstown Bulldogs players
St. George Dragons players
Western Suburbs Magpies players
Rugby league fullbacks
Rugby league halfbacks
Country New South Wales Origin rugby league team players